Palmstruch is a surname. Notable people with the surname include:

Johan Palmstruch (1611–1671), the founder of Stockholms Banco
Johan Wilhelm Palmstruch (1770–1811), Swedish botanist

See also
Palmstruch Bank or the Bank of Palmstruch, alternate names for Stockholms Banco, the first European bank to issue printed banknotes

Swedish-language surnames